Madison Keys was the defending champion but lost in the second round to Ons Jabeur.

Victoria Azarenka won the title via walkover, after Naomi Osaka withdrew from the final with a hamstring injury. This was Azarenka's first singles title since Miami in March 2016, and her first since giving birth to her son Leo in December 2016.

Seeds
The top eight seeds received a bye into the second round.

Draw

Finals

Top half

Section 1

Section 2

Bottom half

Section 3

Section 4

Qualifying

Seeds

Qualifiers

Lucky loser
  Daria Kasatkina

Qualifying draw

First qualifier

Second qualifier

Third qualifier

Fourth qualifier

Fifth qualifier

Sixth qualifier

Seventh qualifier

Eighth qualifier

Ninth qualifier

Tenth qualifier

Eleventh qualifier

Twelfth qualifier

External links
Main Draw
Qualifying Draw

Women's Singles